Balacet is a commune in the Ariège department in the Occitanie region of south-western France.

The inhabitants of the commune are known as Balacetois or Balacetoises.

Geography
Balacet is located some 8 km south-west of Audressein and 3 km north-east of Sentein in the Biros Valley. Access to the commune is by the tortuous D704 road which branches from the D4 just west of Lascoux and goes to the village then continues east to Uchentein. There is also another road that goes west from the village to Irazein. The commune is a rugged mountain commune which is heavily forested.

Neighbouring communes and villages

Administration

List of Successive Mayors

Demography
In 2017 the commune had 26 inhabitants.

Religious heritage
The Parish Church contains several items that are registered as historical objects:
A Pyx of "malades-chrismatoire" (13th century)
A Ciborium (19th century)
2 Candlesticks (18th century)
An Altar, Retable, and Tabernacle (18th century)
A Chalice (17th century)
A Carving: Chrisme (12th century)

See also
Communes of the Ariège department

References

External links
Balacet on Géoportail, National Geographic Institute (IGN) website 
Balacet on the 1750 Cassini Map

Communes of Ariège (department)